The 2007–08 Orlando Magic season was their 19th season in the National Basketball Association. Led by 22-year-old center Dwight Howard, the Magic finished the season with a 52–30 record, finishing first-place in the Southeast Division and advancing to the Eastern Conference Semi-finals where they were eliminated by the Detroit Pistons in 5 games. The Magic had the fourth best team offensive rating in the NBA.

In the playoffs, the Magic defeated the Toronto Raptors in the first round in five games before losing to the Detroit Pistons in the Semi-finals in five games. This marked the first time since 1996 that the Magic made it to the Semi-finals of the playoffs. As from 1997 - 2007, they either were eliminated in the first round or didn't make the playoffs at all. The Magic have repeated this drought, and as of 2022, have not made it to the Semi-finals since 2010.

Key dates
June 6: The Magic hire Stan Van Gundy as head coach, days after Billy Donovan was signed as head coach and released due to a change of heart from Donovan.
June 28: The 2007 NBA draft took place in New York City.
July 1: The free agency period began.
July 11: The Magic acquired Rashard Lewis from the Seattle SuperSonics.
September 29: The Magic opened their training camp at the RDV Sportsplex in Maitland, Florida.
October 31: The Magic's season began with a game against the Milwaukee Bucks.
March 5: The Magic matched the same number of wins as the previous season by defeating the Washington Wizards.
March 12: The Magic were assured a winning season after defeating the Los Angeles Clippers.
March 15: The Magic clinched a playoff berth with a win over the Indiana Pacers.
March 28: The Magic broke the franchise's previous record of road wins in a season by defeating the Milwaukee Bucks, the Magic's 24th win of the season away from home.
March 31: Because of a loss by the Washington Wizards, the Magic clinched the Southeast Division title.
April 16: The Magic played their last game of the regular season.
April 28: The Magic won their first playoff series in 12 years by defeating the Toronto Raptors 4 games to 1.
May 13: The Magic were eliminated from the playoffs, losing to the Detroit Pistons 4 games to 1 in the Eastern Conference Semi-finals.

Offseason

Billy Donovan was signed as head coach of the Magic on June 1  agreeing to a 5-year, $27.5 million deal with the team., to replace recently fired Magic head coach Brian Hill. Donovan had previously led the University of Florida basketball team to back to back NCAA National Championships in 2006 and 2007.  One day later however, Donovan had second thoughts about becoming head coach of the Magic, and wished to be released from his contract to return to his former team, the Florida Gators Men's basketball team. On June 5, the Magic released Donovan from his 5-year contract, under the condition that he would not be allowed to sign as head coach of another NBA team for five years. One day later, the Magic signed Stan Van Gundy as head coach. The deal was reportedly for 4 years, $16 million.

The Magic made a splash in the free agent market by acquiring small forward Rashard Lewis on July 11.  Lewis was re-signed to the Seattle SuperSonics for a six-year league maximum contract, then promptly traded to the Magic in a "sign and trade" for a second-round pick in the 2008 NBA draft. The Sonics earned a mid-level salary cap exemption in the trade. Lewis signed a six-year league-maximum contract believed to be worth over $110 million.

Then the Magic filled in a need and went after a big man after losing Darko Miličić, and signed Center Adonal Foyle who played for the Golden State Warriors and leads the Warriors in most blocks in team history.

The Magic also signed Polish center Marcin Gortat on July 17.  They had acquired his NBA rights from the Phoenix Suns following the 2005 NBA draft.

The Magic got final approval for a new arena on July 26, 2007.  It is expected to be completed in time for the 2010–11 NBA season.

Point guard Jameer Nelson's father, Floyd "Pete" Nelson, disappeared on August 30, and was found dead in the Delaware River in Wilmington, Delaware, on September 2.  A Chester, Pennsylvania, tugboat repairman by trade, the elder Nelson's death was ruled an accident.

Draft picks
Orlando's selections from the 2007 NBA draft in New York City.

Roster

Regular season

Standings

Record vs. opponents

Game log

October
Record: 1–0 ; Home: 1–0 ; Road: 0–0

November
Record: 13–4 ; Home: 4–2 ; Road: 9–2

December
Record: 8–7 ; Home: 2–4 ; Road: 6–3

January
Record: 7–7 ; Home: 5–2 ; Road: 2–5

February
Record: 8–5 ; Home: 4–3 ; Road: 4–2

March
Record: 10–4 ; Home: 7–3 ; Road: 3–1

April
Record: 5–3; Home: 2–2; Road: 3–1

Green background indicates win.
Red background indicates loss.

Playoffs

|- bgcolor="bbffbb"
| 1 || April 20 || Toronto || 114–100 || Howard (25) || Howard (22) || Nelson (7) ||Amway Arena17,519 || 1–0
|- bgcolor="bbffbb"
| 2 || April 22 || Toronto || 104–103 || Howard (29) || Howard (20) || Two-Way Tie (5) ||Amway Arena17,519 || 2–0
|- bgcolor="edbebf"
| 3 || April 24 || @ Toronto || 94–108 || Türkoğlu (26) || Howard (12) || Nelson (6) ||Air Canada Centre20,023 || 2–1
|- bgcolor="bbffbb"
| 4 || April 26 || @ Toronto || 106–94 || Lewis (26) || Howard (16) || Two-Way Tie (5) ||Air Canada Centre  20,416 || 3–1
|- bgcolor="bbffbb"
| 5 || April 28 || Toronto || 102–92 || Howard (21) || Howard (21) || Türkoğlu (9) ||Amway Arena 17,519 || 4–1
|-

|- bgcolor="edbebf"
| 1 || May 3 || @ Detroit || 72–91 || Two-Way Tie (18) || Howard (8) || Nelson (5) ||The Palace of Auburn Hills22,076 || 0–1
|- bgcolor="edbebf"
| 2 || May 5 || @ Detroit || 93–100 || Howard, Nelson (22) || Howard (18) || Türkoğlu (7) ||The Palace of Auburn Hills22,076 || 0–2
|- bgcolor="bbffbb"
| 3 || May 7 || Detroit || 111–86 || Lewis (33) || Howard (12) || Türkoğlu (6) ||Amway Arena17,519 || 1–2
|- bgcolor="edbebf"
| 4 || May 10 || Detroit || 89–90  ||  Türkoğlu (20) || Howard (12) || Nelson (6) || Amway Arena17,519 || 1–3
|- bgcolor="edbebf"
| 5 || May 13 || @ Detroit || 86–91 || Türkoğlu (18) || Howard (17) || Türkoğlu (7) ||The Palace of Auburn Hills22,076 || 1–4
|-

Player stats

Regular season

*Total for entire season including previous team(s)

Playoffs

Awards and records
Dwight Howard – All-NBA 1st Team, All-Defensive 2nd Team, Rebounding Champion, Slam Dunk Contest Champion, All-Star
Hedo Türkoğlu – Most Improved Player

Records

Milestones

Transactions
The Magic have been involved in the following transactions during the 2007–08 season.

Trades
In November 2007 the Magic traded Trevor Ariza to the Los Angeles Lakers for Maurice Evans and Brian Cook.

Free agents

References

Orlando Magic seasons
2007–08 NBA season by team
2007 in sports in Florida
2008 in sports in Florida